"All These Things" is a 1962 single written by Allen Toussaint under the pseudonym of "Naomi Neville", and first recorded  by Art Neville in 1962.

Joe Stampley version
The biggest chart hit version was performed by Joe Stampley.  In 1966,The Uniques recorded the song with Joe Stampley singing lead.  "All These Things" was Stampley's third number one on the country chart. The single stayed at number one for a single week and spent a total of thirteen weeks on the chart.

Charts

Weekly charts

Year-end charts

Cover versions 
An early recording was also done by Lee Tillman,  
A re-recording in 1981 charted at number 62. 
John Boutté recorded it as well, and performs it regularly, and also performed it at Allen Toussaint's memorial. 
James Booker recorded the song on his album Classified (1982). 
Elvis Costello recorded the song with Toussaint in 2006 for the album The River in Reverse.

References

1976 singles
Joe Stampley songs
Dot Records singles
1976 songs
Songs written by Allen Toussaint